A determinancy diagram, sometimes known as a dependency diagram, is a diagram which documents the determinancy or dependency between a set of data items. Determinancy diagrams are particularly used as an aid to database normalization.

References

See also 
Database design
Dependency diagram

Diagrams